Mars Hill High School, also known as Mars Hill School and Mars Hill Elementary School, is a historic high school building located at Mars Hill, Madison County, North Carolina.  It was built between 1936 and 1938 by the Works Progress Administration (WPA) and is a one-story native stone building in the WPA Rustic style. It consists of two sections: a rear-facing "L"-shaped classroom block and a gymnasium wing  Mars Hill High School continued to serve the community as a high school until a new high school was built in 1973.  The building housed middle and elementary school students until 2001.

It was listed on the National Register of Historic Places in 2005.

The building is currently undergoing renovations to become resident apartments.

References

High schools in North Carolina
School buildings on the National Register of Historic Places in North Carolina
Works Progress Administration in North Carolina
School buildings completed in 1938
Buildings and structures in Madison County, North Carolina
National Register of Historic Places in Madison County, North Carolina